The Prussian scheme is the name of a reported 1786 attempt by President of the Continental Congress Nathaniel Gorham, acting in possible concert with other persons influential in the government of the United States, to establish a monarchy in the U.S. under the rule of Henry of Prussia, a prince of the House of Hohenzollern, possibly to resolve the ongoing political crises occurring during the last days of the Articles of Confederation. The attempt may have died due to a lack of interest on Henry's part, popular opposition to a rumored proposal involving a different potential monarch, the convening of the Philadelphia Convention, or some combination thereof.



Background

Post-revolutionary monarchist tendencies

The protracted disturbances created by the shortcomings of the Articles of Confederation as the United States' constitution, which culminated in Shays' Rebellion, reportedly gave rise to a "class of men in the community who gave very serious apprehensions to the advocates for a Republican form of government". Prior to, and following, the May 1787 convening of the Philadelphia Convention, widely circulated rumors reported that the conclave was meeting for the purpose of offering to enthrone Prince Frederick, Duke of York and Albany as king of the United States. So acute were the rumors that the convention issued a public denial that any proposal for a reestablishment of monarchy was being considered, the denial later being repeated in a letter sent by Alexander Martin to the governor of North Carolina.

American attitudes toward Prussia
American public opinion at the time generally regarded Prussia warmly. Prince Henry's older brother, Frederick the Great, harbored an "immense hatred" toward Great Britain for having abandoned Prussia near the end of the Seven Years' War. During the American Revolution, he had closed Prussian territory to passage by the army of the Principality of Anhalt-Zerbst, a British ally. This required military forces from the landlocked nation to make a circuitous journey to reach a seaport for deployment to North America, during which nearly half of Anhalt-Zerbst troops deserted. Similar restrictions were placed on troops from other British allies attempting to transit to North America, including the Principality of Bayreuth, the Margraviate of Ansbach, and the Landgraviate of Hesse-Kassel.

Proposal

Early allegations
According to Rufus King, at about the same time the rumors pertaining to Prince Frederick were circulating, Nathaniel Gorham secretly corresponded to Prince Henry of Prussia offering to create him as monarch of the United States. The popular version of the story has Henry declining on account of the fact he did not believe the American public would be likely to submit to a king. Later referred to as "the Prussian scheme", Rufus King's report of Gorham's offer was long considered apocryphal, though James Monroe later confided to Andrew Jackson that he was aware some members of what would become the Federalist Party had, nearly two decades before, "entertained principles unfriendly to our system of government".

Possible confirmation
In the early 20th century an unsent letter was discovered in the Prussian archives from Henry, addressed to Baron Friedrich Wilhelm von Steuben who was, at the time the letter was written, living in retirement in New York City. The letter, believed dated several months before the Philadelphia convention, refers to an offer the prince had received substantially similar to that detailed in the original story. In it, Henry reports he is not interested in an American crown but recommends, instead, that an unnamed French candidate be considered for the position.

Influence
Some have attributed the natural-born-citizen clause in the U.S. constitution as an attempt by the Philadelphia Convention to end the persistence of rumors of European royalty being invited to assume a hypothetical United States throne.

See also
 Business Plot (a reported military coup planned for late 1933) 
 Newburgh Conspiracy (a reported military coup planned in 1783)
 Newburgh letter (a reported offer to enthrone George Washington as king of the United States)

References

Conspiracy theories in the United States
Cover-ups
History of the government of the United States
Constitution of the United States
Monarchism in the United States